Paradise Don't Come Cheap, is the second and most recent album by American psychedelic hip hop duo New Kingdom. It was released on July 9, 1996, on Gee Street Records.

Track listing
 Mexico or Bust—3:27
 Horse Latitudes—2:36
 Infested—3:50
 Unicorns Were Horses—3:44
 Kickin' Like Bruce Lee—1:27
 Shining Armor—3:17
 Paradise Don't Come Cheap—3:04
 Co-Pilot—2:50
 Big 10 1/2—4:20
 Valhalla Soothsayer—2:21
 Animal—5:34
 Half-Asleep—0:53
 Terror-Mad Visionary—3:17
 Suspended in Air—4:11
 Journey to the Sun—3:54

References

 http://www.allmusic.com/album/paradise-dont-come-cheap-mw0000190017

1996 albums
Gee Street Records albums
New Kingdom (band) albums